Félix Agustín González Dalmás is an Argentine former footballer who formerly serves as dual-manager of the Cambodia national football team, alongside former Japanese national team player Keisuke Honda.

Career statistics

Club

Notes

Managerial

References

External links

1988 births
Living people
Argentine footballers
Argentine expatriate footballers
Association football midfielders
SP Kyoto FC players
Club Plaza Colonia de Deportes players
Japan Football League players
Uruguayan Segunda División players
Cambodia national football team managers
Argentine expatriate sportspeople in Japan
Expatriate footballers in Japan
Argentine expatriate sportspeople in Uruguay
Expatriate footballers in Uruguay
Expatriate football managers in Cambodia
Argentine football managers
Footballers from Buenos Aires